"Christmas Day" was a holiday single released by Squeeze in 1979. The single was released only in the United Kingdom and failed to chart, a major surprise since the band had had consecutive number two hits earlier that year. The song itself was not included on an album, but appeared between the releases of Cool for Cats and Argybargy. It can, however, be found on the Japanese 2007 remaster of Cool for Cats along with its B-side.

Track listing
 "Christmas Day" (3:50)
 "Going Crazy" (2:25)

Squeeze (band) songs
1979 singles
British Christmas songs
Songs written by Chris Difford
Songs written by Glenn Tilbrook
1979 songs